Ri Ul-sol (리을설; 14 September 19217 November 2015) was a North Korean politician and military official. He played an important role in the administrations of Kim Il-sung and Kim Jong-il, achieving the rank of Marshal of the Korean People's Army. He was responsible for the safety of top North Korean leaders and their families as Commander of the Guard.

Early life and education
Ri Ul-sol was born in 1921 in Chongjin, North Hamgyong Province.

He may have been trained at the Okeanskaya Field School in Vladivostok or in the RKKA Military Academy in Khabarovsk, both in the Soviet Union.

His Military Career 

In the late 1930s, Ri was a soldier in Kim Il-sung's United Army, which was a partisan unit. He fought for Korea's independence from Japan alongside Kim Il-sung in World War II. Ri served in the 88th Sniper Brigade with Kim Il-sung, Kim Chol-man and other first-generation North Korean politicians. During the outbreak of the Korean War, Ri Ul-sol was responsible for the care of Kim Jong-il and Kim Kyong-hui, the children of Kim Il-sung. It is said that Ri assumed the position of surrogate father to Kim Jong-il, the future North Korean leader.

He was promoted through the North Korean military system, earning the following ranks:

He was one of only a handful to have been promoted to the rank of Marshal, the second highest North Korean military rank. (The others are or were Kim Jong-il, O Jin-u, Choe Kwang, Kim Jong-un, Kim Yong-chun, Hyon Chol-hae, Ri Pyong-chol and Pak Jong-chon). His full title was Marshal of the Korean People's Army. In his other major position, Commander of the Guard (1996–2003), he was responsible for guarding the top North Korean officials, including Kim Jong-il and his family. The Guard Command is one of the few military positions which show little turnover, as Ri managed to hold onto his position from 1984 to 2003. Furthermore, Ri Ul-sol became a member of the Central Military Commission of the WPK in October 1980, and a member of the National Defence Commission in May 1990.

Political career
Ri was a deputy delegate to the 3rd, 8th, 9th, 10th, 11th and 12th Supreme People's Assemblies. In the 10th SPA, he represented Electoral District 583, and in the 12th SPA, he represented Electoral District 1. He was also a member of the Central Committee of the Workers' Party of Korea in November 1970.

He was part of the Funeral Committees for both Kim Il-sung and O Jin-u. The funeral committees are often seen as an indicator of de facto power.

Politically, Ri Ul-sol was one of the last surviving members of the first generation of North Korean leadership. He was seen as an ultraconservative. He retired from most of his positions in 2003 during a reshuffle and was subsequently not considered to be a major player in North Korean politics.

Awards
Ri Ul-sol was the recipient of various awards, including the Order of Kim Il-sung, Hero of Labour and Order of the National Flag (1st class). He was twice awarded the title of the Hero of the DPRK.

Death
Ri Ul-sol died of lung cancer on 7 November 2015. His funeral committee consisted of 169 members, with Kim Jong-un as chairman.

References

1921 births
Workers' Party of Korea politicians
North Korean military personnel
North Korean military personnel of the Korean War
Marshals
Korean independence activists
Korean revolutionaries
People from Chongjin
2015 deaths
National Heroes of North Korea
People of 88th Separate Rifle Brigade